Kalyan Dombivli Municipal Transport (KDMT) is a public transport company operating in India, run by the Kalyan Dombivli Municipal Corporation. It is run by the municipal corporation of Kalyan and Dombivli. Its main head office is to the opposite of KDMC and two branches to launch daily bus services for the welfare of the people of Kalyan and Dombivli (mainly) and also for small neighboring towns, cities, and villages.

KDMT Bus routes

See also 
 Transportation in Thane
 BEST Bus
 Navi Mumbai Municipal Transport (NMMT)
 Thane Municipal Transport
 Mira-Bhayandar Municipal Transport
 Thane

References 

Kalyan-Dombivli
Transport in Kalyan-Dombivli
Municipal transport agencies of India
1997 establishments in Maharashtra
Indian companies established in 1997
Transport companies established in 1997
Companies based in Maharashtra